Kemp Alan Rasmussen (born May 25, 1979) was an American football defensive lineman in the NFL for the Seattle Seahawks. He previously played for the Carolina Panthers. Rasmussen played college football at Indiana University. He is currently a firefighter with the Charlotte Fire Department

1979 births
American football defensive ends
Carolina Panthers players
Living people
Seattle Seahawks players